Robert Waly Lopez Mendy (born 23 February 1987) is a Senegalese professional footballer who plays as a striker for Philippine club Kaya F.C.–Iloilo.

Career

Green Archers United
Lopez Mendy moved to the Philippines in August 2013 to play in the United Football League (UFL). He joined Green Archers United and scored the last goal in the team's 5–0 victory over Philippine Navy in the 2013 UFL Cup group stage. Green Archers finished third in the tournament.

In the 2014 league season, Lopez Mendy played as a midfielder. On 23 January, on an assist provided by Chieffy Caligdong, he scored the second goal in a 2–2 draw with Philippine Army. He then scored on the fourth minute in an eventual 4–1 loss to Stallion on 25 February. On 22 March, he scored the Archers' first goal in a 2–1 comeback win against Loyola Meralco Sparks. In the next match, on 27 March, he scored a brace in the 2–1 victory over Team Socceroo, with the second goal scored in the 89th minute. He then scored a consolation goal in another 4–1 loss to Stallion on 10 April. He then scored a brace and registered an assist in the following match, a 4–2 win over Philippine Army. On 29 April, he scored a brace in a 2–1 win over Pasargad, with the first goal scored on the 8th minute. On 3 May, he converted the penalty to equalize 1–1 with Loyola Meralco Sparks. A month later, on 3 June, he scored a brace in the 2–0 win over Kaya. He netted another brace in the first half of their 3–0 win over Philippine Army on 19 June, their second to the last match of the season. Lopez Mendy ended the season with 15 goals.

During the first UFL All-Star Weekend held on 25 April 2015, Lopez Mendy played in the Philippines vs the Rest of the World exhibition game. He was named man of the match for scoring a hat-trick in the second half as the foreigners won 5–4.

In the 2015 UFL Cup group stage, Lopez Mendy scored a brace within 6 minutes of game time as the Archers defeated Pasargad 6–0 on 10 May. In their last group match against Ceres, he scored in the 3rd minute of an eventual 4–1 defeat. GAU were later  eliminated in the quarter-finals.

Kaya
Lopez Mendy was signed by Kaya for their 2016 season. He scored a total of 11 goals in the 2016 UFL Cup, making him the tournament's top scorer as Kaya finished third. He found the net a lot that season, including a brace to help Kaya beat his former club Green Archers United 5-1. However, the Senegalese striker was sent off despite scoring Kaya's only goal to help beat Loyola Meralco 1-0, his only red card that season. Lopez Mendy was still part of Kaya for the maiden season of the incipient Philippines Football League (PFL) in 2017. For the 2018 season, Lopez Mendy was named Player of the Season by Kaya's fan club.

UiTM
In January 2019 it was reported that Lopez Mendy has joined UiTM F.C. of the second-tier league Malaysia Premier League.

Ceres–Negros / United City
Lopez Mendy returned to the Philippines to sign up to play for Ceres Negros of the PFL in August 2019. At the 2019 Copa Paulino Alcantara, in which his club Ceres Negros won the title, Lopez Mendy won the Golden Boot individual award for scoring five goals in the whole tournament.

When Ceres Negros had a management overhaul in July 2020 and was renamed as United City, the new management re-signed Lopez Mendy to play for the club. After the conclusion of the 2020 season, United City in February 2021 announced the departure of Lopez Mendy from the club to play for a Cambodian club.

Personal life
Robert Waly Lopez Mendy was born on 23 February 1987 in Dakar, Senegal. He earned a college degree in French language and literature  from College Sacre Coeur in Dakar.

In 2016, he married his Filipina wife, Maebel "Ameera" Ybera Lacastesantos; the couple have a son.

On 3 March 2020, a Senate bill was passed by Senator Juan Miguel Zubiri to grant Filipino citizenship to Lopez Mendy through naturalization. It can make him eligible to play for the Philippines national team.

Honours

Club
Green Archers United
 United Football League Cup third place: 2013

Kaya–Iloilo
 Copa Paulino Alcantara: 2018
 United Football League Cup third place: 2016

Ceres–Negros / United City
 Philippines Football League: 2019, 2020
 Copa Paulino Alcantara: 2019

Individual
 Copa Paulino Alcantara Golden Boot: 2019
 United Football League Cup top scorer: 2016

References 

1987 births
Footballers from Dakar
Senegalese expatriate footballers
Association football forwards
Senegalese footballers
Living people
Expatriate footballers in the Philippines
Kaya F.C. players
Ceres–Negros F.C. players
Expatriate footballers in Cambodia
Senegalese expatriate sportspeople in the Philippines
Senegalese expatriate sportspeople in Cambodia